Cecil Kent Drinker (March 17, 1887 – April 19, 1956) was an American physician and founder of the Harvard School of Public Health. He was professor at Harvard School of Public Health from 1923 till 1935. Drinker was involved in the effect of radium on the women painting luminous dials.
Drinker's father was railroad man and Lehigh University president Henry Sturgis Drinker; his siblings included lawyer and musicologist Henry Sandwith Drinker, Jr., industrial hygienist Philip Drinker and biographer Catherine Drinker Bowen.

Drinker was married to Katherine Rotan Drinker.

References

External links 

 Cecil Kent Drinker papers, 1898-1958. H MS c165. Harvard Medical Library, Francis A. Countway Library of Medicine, Boston, Mass.

1887 births
1956 deaths
Lehigh University alumni
Harvard Medical School faculty
Drinker family